Gao Gan (died 206), courtesy name Yuancai, was a minor warlord who lived during the late Eastern Han dynasty of China. He was a maternal nephew and subordinate of the warlord Yuan Shao.

Life
Gao Gan was from an influential family in Yu County, Chenliu Commandery, which is around present-day Qi County, Kaifeng, Henan. He was also a maternal nephew of the warlord Yuan Shao, who controlled most of the territories in northern China from the 190s to his death in 202. Gao Gan held the appointment of Inspector of Bing Province, which was one of the four provinces in northern China under Yuan Shao's control around 200 CE. He governed Bing Province for about seven years.

In 200 CE, Yuan Shao lost the Battle of Guandu against his rival, Cao Cao, who controlled the Han central government and the figurehead Emperor Xian. After Yuan Shao's defeat, only the troops under Gao Gan's command in Bing Province, numbering about 50,000, were the most organised and highest in morale among all of Yuan Shao's forces.

After Yuan Shao's death in 202, Gao Gan gained support from Guo Yuan and the southern Xiongnu leader Huchuquan to counter Cao Cao's advances into northern China. However, he decided to surrender to Cao Cao in 203 after Guo Yuan's defeat and after internal conflict broke out between Yuan Shao's sons Yuan Tan and Yuan Shang. Cao Cao allowed him to continue serving as the Inspector of Bing Province after his surrender.

Although Gao Gan surrendered to Cao Cao, he was only pretending to do so. In 205, when Cao Cao was away on a campaign against Yuan Shang and the Wuhuan tribes, Gao Gan seized the opportunity to start a rebellion in Bing Province. He took the Administrator of Shangdang Commandery (上黨郡; a commandery in Bing Province) hostage and fortified his defences at Hu Pass (壺關; west of present-day Lucheng, Shanxi). Cao Cao's forces, led by Li Dian and Yue Jin, attacked Gao Gan at Hu Pass but could not overcome him even after some months of siege.

In 206, Cao Cao turned back and personally led his forces to attack Gao Gan. Gao Gan fled from Hu Pass, leaving behind his subordinates Xia Zhao and Deng Sheng to defend the pass, and went to seek help from the Xiongnu. After the Xiongnu refused to help him, Gao Gan headed south towards Jing Province to seek aid from Liu Biao, the provincial governor. However, along the way, Wang Yan, the Colonel-Director of Retainers, led his troops to intercept Gao Gan and kill him and then present his head to Cao Cao.

See also
 Lists of people of the Three Kingdoms

References

 Chen, Shou (3rd century). Records of the Three Kingdoms (Sanguozhi).
 Pei, Songzhi (5th century). Annotations to Records of the Three Kingdoms (Sanguozhi zhu).

2nd-century births
206 deaths
Generals under Yuan Shao
Politicians from Kaifeng
Political office-holders in Shanxi
Han dynasty warlords
Generals under Cao Cao
Officials under Cao Cao
Officials under Yuan Shao
Han dynasty generals from Henan
Han dynasty politicians from Henan
Han dynasty people killed in battle